Os Dias Eram Assim (English title: Dark Days) is a Brazilian telenovela produced and broadcast by TV Globo. It premiered on 17 April 2017.

Plot 

The story begins on 21 June 1970, date of the end of the World Cup, which Brazil wins. Amid the celebrations there's a political and social contrast, promoted by the military dictatorship, where Alice (Sophie Charlotte) and Renato (Renato Góes) meet and start a love story that lasts for nearly 20 years, going through several historic events until the Diretas Já.

The doctor Renato is the eldest son of Vera (Cássia Kis), owner of a bookstore in Copacabana, and has two siblings: Gustavo (Gabriel Leone), who goes out in the streets seeking freedom, and Maria (Carla Salle), who uses art as a way of expression and manifestation.

Raised into a conservative family, Alice, a Languages student, is the daughter of Arnaldo (Antonio Calloni), a contractor and supporter of the dictatorship who works for the government, and Kiki (Natália do Vale), who are always in conflict: Arnaldo constantly blames Kiki for their daughter's rebellious nature. Alice goes against her parents' wishes and leaves her longtime boyfriend Vitor (Daniel de Oliveira), her father's right-hand man.

Infuriated by Alice's refusal to marry him, Vitor accuses Renato of subversion, which forces him to run away to Chile. He expects Alice to follow him, but she ends up not going. There, Renato meets Rimena (Maria Casadevall), a fellow doctor, with whom he has a lot in common. After the law of amnesty in 1979, Renato returns to Brazil, where he runs into Alice again, and old feelings resurface.

Cast

Participations

References

External links 
  
 

2017 telenovelas
Brazilian telenovelas
2017 Brazilian television series debuts
2017 Brazilian television series endings
TV Globo telenovelas
Brazilian LGBT-related television shows
Gay-related television shows
Portuguese-language telenovelas